Four ships of the French Navy have been named Montcalm in honour of the 18th century Marshal Marquess Louis de Montcalm de Saint Véran:

 , 1865–1891
 , 1900–1926
 , 1933–1969, which served in the Free French Forces
 , 1975, a 

French Navy ship names